Inkberrow is a village in Worcestershire, England, often thought to be the model for Ambridge, the setting of BBC Radio 4's long-running series The Archers. In particular, The Bull, the fictional Ambridge pub, is supposed to be based on The Old Bull in Inkberrow.

The village's parish church is dedicated to St. Peter and contains the Savage family chapel.

In 2006, Inkberrow was awarded the title of Worcestershire Village of the Year and  won the Building Community Life section of the competition.

Inkberrow was marked as a new town in the 1960s, but this plan was not carried out. More houses were added to the village in 2013 because of a rising need for accommodation. Inkberrow Millennium Green is an 8-acre public open space to the east of the village, opened in 2000, which includes a medieval moat and fishpond, a variety of  wildflowers and fruit trees, and a millennium seat with extensive views.

History

The earliest recorded version of the village is Intanbeorgan, from the 8th and 9th century.

By the 15th century, the spelling may have become Ingtebarwe, since nearby villages also mentioned include Church Lench, Abbots Morton & Arrow 

By the 16th century, it was known as Inkebarrow.

The area was within Feckenham Forest, a royal forest with harsh forest law punishments.

Cookhill Priory stood three miles east, at the edge of the county.

Sports
The village has junior and adult football clubs with large memberships when compared to those of higher populated towns and villages. Inkberrow Football Club play in Midland Football League Division Two, and have two 11 a-side pitches and a mini soccer pitch.

There is also a tennis club in Inkberrow, with a clubhouse near the village hall.

Music
Former Inkberrow residents brothers Justin Jones (guitar) and Simon Huw Jones (vocals) formed the post-punk band And Also the Trees in 1979 along with other future members Nick Havas, Graham Havas and Steven Burrows. Their music was and remains heavily inspired by their rural upbringing, producing a pastoral take on the sound then dominated by bands from urban areas. They continue to produce music today and have garnered critical acclaim and a cult following around the world.

See also
Inkberrow Castle
Cookhill Priory

References

External links
Inkberrow web site
Inkberrow Football Club

The Archers
Villages in Worcestershire